James Beckwith is a London-based jazz pianist and composer.

Beckwith studied Jazz at Leeds College of Music, winning the John Dankworth Prize for Jazz Composition and spent some years in Canada before returning home to study composition at Trinity Laban Conservatoire of Music and Dance.

His album SE10 (named after his Greenwich postal code) features Chelsea Carmichael (winner of Breakthrough Act of the Year at Jazz FM Awards), Sheila Maurice-Grey (of Kokoroko and SEED Ensemble), James Copus, Joe Downard and Harry Pope.

Beckwith has headlined shows at Ronnie Scott's Jazz Club and performs regularly with the aforementioned Harry Pope in the band of trumpeter Jackson Mathod.

References

British male jazz musicians
Living people
Year of birth missing (living people)